Colleen Duffy Kiko (born October 15, 1950) is an American attorney and government official who, until January 2021, served as Chair of the Federal Labor Relations Authority (FLRA). Prior to assuming her current role, she was a Judge of the Employees' Compensation Appeals Board in the United States Department of Labor. Kiko worked in the predecessor agency to the FLRA and first joined the newly created agency in 1979 in order to investigate unfair labor practices. In 2005, she became general counsel of the FLRA. Kiko has also held various roles in the United States Department of Justice, served as an associate counsel to the United States House Committee on the Judiciary, and engaged in the private practice of law.

References

External links
 Biography at the Department of Labor
 Collen Kiko on C-SPAN

Living people
North Dakota lawyers
North Dakota State University alumni
Antonin Scalia Law School alumni
21st-century American lawyers
George W. Bush administration personnel
Trump administration personnel
1950 births